Yvette Brind'Amour,  (November 30, 1918 – April 4, 1991) was a Canadian actress.

In 1949, she co-founded, with Mercedes Palomino, the Théâtre du Rideau Vert, Quebec's oldest French theatre, in Montreal where she was born. She was artistic director until her death. In 1967 she was made an Officer of the Order of Canada and was promoted to Companion in 1982. In 1985 she was made an Officer of the National Order of Quebec. In 1987 she was awarded the Molson Prize. In 1969 she was awarded an honorary D.B.-A from University of Ottawa.

She was married for much of her adult life to writer and filmmaker Paul Gury, until his death in 1974.

After her death in 1991, she was entombed at the Notre Dame des Neiges Cemetery in Montreal.

References

External links
 

1918 births
1991 deaths
Actresses from Montreal
Canadian stage actresses
Canadian television actresses
Companions of the Order of Canada
Officers of the National Order of Quebec
20th-century Canadian actresses
Burials at Notre Dame des Neiges Cemetery